Sarajevo Graduate School of Business (SGSB) is a private university located in Sarajevo, Bosnia and Herzegovina.  It is mainly focused on MBA degree.

The school is in partnership with Texas A&M University located in Commerce, Texas, United States and the International Burch University located in Sarajevo.

Education in Bosnia and Herzegovina
Universities in Bosnia and Herzegovina
Universities in Sarajevo